Ibrahim Waheed Hassan (born 15 November 1995) is a Maldivian professional footballer who plays as a midfielder for Maziya S&RC.

Career
Waheed played for New Radiant, before joining TC Sports in 2017.

International
Waheed was first called up for Maldives national football team in March 2017 for 2019 AFC Asian Cup qualification match against Palestine at home, but was on bench as an unused substitute. He made his debut against Palestine on 14 November 2017, in the 2019 AFC Asian Cup qualification match away from home. He came in as a 59th-minute substitute for Ahmed Zaad.

International goals
Scores and results list Maldives' goal tally first.

Honours

Maldives
SAFF Championship: 2018

References

External links
 
 
 Ibrahim Waheed Hassan at worldfootball.com

1995 births
Living people
Maldivian footballers
Association football midfielders
Maldives international footballers
T.C. Sports Club players